Coon Creek is a stream in Miller County in the U.S. state of Missouri. It is a tributary of the Osage River.

The stream headwaters arise along the south side of Missouri Route A about one mile east of that roads intersection with Missouri Route 17. The stream flows northeast passing under Route A then turns north-northwest to pass under Missouri Route 52 and enters the Osage about three miles northeast (downstream) of Tuscumbia.

Coon Creek was so named due to the presence of raccoons near its course.

See also
List of rivers of Missouri

References

Rivers of Miller County, Missouri
Rivers of Missouri